Karl-Gustav Sauberzweig (1 September 1899 – 20 October 1946) was a German Army Oberst (Colonel) who transferred to the Waffen-SS during World War II and commanded the 13th Waffen Mountain Division of the SS Handschar (1st Croatian) in 1943–1944, and the IX Waffen Mountain Corps of the SS (Croatian) in 1944–1945, reaching the rank of Gruppenführer and Generalleutnant of the Waffen SS. He returned to the Wehrmacht in January 1945 and was appointed as a Generalleutnant to command a corps within Army Group H in northern Germany. Sauberzweig was a bespectacled Prussian career army officer who had earned an Iron Cross I Class and commanded an infantry company in his late teens during World War I. He was fluent in Spanish and worked in signals in the Wehrmacht during the interwar period.

Early life and career
Born in Wissek (Wysoka), Province of Posen, to Dr. Joachim Sauberzweig and educated in Bromberg, Karl-Gustav Sauberzweig entered the army on 28 September 1916 as an officer-cadet (Fahnenjunker). He was assigned to the second branch Brandenburg Grenadier Regiment Prinz Karl von Preußen (Prince Charles of Prussia) No. 12. On 17 May 1917 he was promoted to ensign and again on 25 August he was promoted to Leutnant ohne Patent (lieutenant without Commission). By November 1918 he was serving in the 2nd Brandenburg Grenadier Regiment Prinz Karl von Preußen (Prince Charles of Prussia) No. 12. as a company commander. In 1918 he was wounded and was awarded the wound badge in black (Verwundetenabzeichen in Schwarz) and subsequently the Iron Cross. In May 1919 he was accepted as a Leutnant (lieutenant) in the Reichsheer. His Commission was dated 1 October 1917 to 1 July 1922. He was then appointed as aide-de-camp to the Army 54th Infantry Regiment. In early February 1920, Sauberzweig was transferred to the Army 10th Infantry Regiment.

"A proven leader of men, Sauberzweig had commanded a company and garnered the Iron Cross First Class by the age of eighteen, and earned a reputation as an exceptional organizer. His tireless determination and exacting work ethic earned him the nickname Schnellchen ("Speedy")."

In the formation of the Versailles Treaty 100,000 men German army, Sauberzweig was then inducted into the third (Prussian) Infantry Regiment. This unit was then used initially to train men in a machine-gun company. From 1 June 1922, he was in the 8th (Prussian) Infantry Regiment and remained here until the spring of 1924, when he became company officer in the 8th machine-gun company in Legnica. On 15 December 1924 he married Erna Giese and on 17 November 1925, his son Dieter, was born in Frankfurt an der Oder.

Over 1924/25 Sauberzweig was then in the Third Company of the 8th (Prussian) Infantry Regiment in Frankfurt an der Oder. In April 1925 he was promoted to Oberleutnant (senior lieutenant). Over 1926/27 Sauberzweig was then in the second Company of the 8th (Prussian) Infantry Regiment, in Frankfurt an der Oder. From 1927/28 he was then for the next few years assigned to the 4th machine-gun Company of the 8th  (Prussian) Infantry Regiment also in Frankfurt an der Oder. On 1 October 1930 Sauberzweig was promoted to the headquarters of the 3rd Division of the Reichswehr in Berlin. There, he completed his officer training.

In March 1932 he was involved in an accident that disabled him for some time. In April 1933 he was promoted to Hauptmann (Captain). As such, he was on 1 July 1933 appointed to Division D in the artillery school Jüterbog. There he was employed as a Taktiklehrer (tactics instructor) in Signals. With the expansion of the Reichswehr into the Wehrmacht, Sauberzweig was on 1 October 1934 transferred as a teacher to the Army and Air Force Signals school in Halle, Saxony-Anhalt. On 1 August 1935, he was transferred, as a company commander for the Signals department Potsdam.

In the fall of 1936, Sauberzweig was promoted second Staff Officer (Ib) to the General Command XI. Army Corps and moved to Hanover. He was then responsible for quartermaster supplies and care. On 1 October 1936 Sauberzweig was promoted to the rank of Major and on 1 March 1938 to Oberstleutnant (lieutenant colonel). After the annexation of Austria, he was assigned on 1 April 1938 to the General Command XVII. Army Corps in Vienna. In this capacity, he was then, at the beginning of World War II employed in the Polish campaign.

World War II
At the end of September 1939, Sauberzweig was placed in the training department of the General Staff of the Army. In mid-December 1939, he returned to the General Command XI. Army Corps and in the spring of 1940 became the first appointed Staff Officer (Ia) of XI. Army Corps. In this capacity, he then took part in the 1940 western campaign. On 1 June 1940 Sauberzweig was wounded in the south-east of Dunkirk and remained in the Army Corps until 1941.

On 1 June 1941 Sauberzweig was appointed as commander of the Wehrmacht 466th Infantry Regiment which he led on the Eastern Front during the attack on southern Russia. On 18 August 1941, he was seriously hospitalised due to an injury: he got sand grains and rock fragments in an eye socket and was thereafter blinded in one eye. After his recovery, he was appointed in early October 1941 as commander of the 306th Infantry Regiment in the German army in occupied France. In mid-January 1942 Sauberzweig quit this command and was transferred to the reserve officer pool. He was then employed by Army Group North (in Russia) as a staff training leader. On 1 February 1942, he was promoted to Oberst (colonel). On 1 May 1942, he was appointed commander of the Infantry Replacement Regiment 131 in Brno, Bohemia. At the end of October 1942, he gave up his command and from 1 November 1942 Sauberzweig was employed as Wehrmacht chief of staff in the inspection of the education and training system.

Waffen SS
On 1 August 1943 Oberst Karl-Gustav Sauberzweig formally transferred to the Waffen SS and was appointed SS Oberführer. A week later he was placed in command of the nascent Kroatische-SS-Freiwilligen-Division (Croatian SS Volunteer Division, later called the 13th Waffen Mountain Division of the SS Handschar (1st Croatian)). Sauberzweig arrived in Mende, Lozère, France, to assume command from the Austrian Oberführer Herbert von Obwurzer on 9 August 1943. Once in office, Sauberzweig treated the Bosnian recruits as sons. Dzemal Ibrahimovic recalled over 50 years later that he often addressed the men "Children, children."

Two weeks later Sauberzweig prepared a character sketch of the average Bosnian volunteer: "The Bosnian is a very good soldier. His strength lies in the use of terrain and in close combat." He was therefore very distressed by the Villefranche-de-Rouergue mutiny on 17 September, and immediately ordered the disarming of all non-German personnel and martial law. The local Mayor was arrested during the fracas but Sauberzweig ordered his prompt release. Ultimately 825 "dark elements" as Sauberzweig called them, were removed from the Division permanently. However, this and a falling off in recruitment led to staff problems, and he was constantly complaining to the SS personnel office in Berlin about his urgent need for battalion commanders. On 1 October 1943, Karl-Gustav Sauberzweig was promoted to the rank of SS Brigadeführer and Generalmajor of Waffen SS. 

In October 1943, after the division relocated to Neuhammer, Germany, to complete training, Sauberzweig lectured the men during the Bajram (Eid al Fitr) festivities: "This is the first feast that the entire division will observe together. We want to observe it as a sign that we have grown together into a community of prosperity." Reichsführer-SS Heinrich Himmler visited the division on 21 November 1943 and again over 11 and 12 January 1944. At the November inspection, Sauberzweig instructed the division's Albanian recruits and parts of the artillery to conduct a special exercise to demonstrate their efficiency and proficiency. He also twice hosted Mohammad Amin al-Husayni, the Grand Mufti of Jerusalem, at Neuhammer.

Curiously, considering the Division's supposedly Islamic basis, Sauberzweig sent a handwritten Christmas greeting to Himmler at the end of 1943: "Reichsführer! The officers, NCOs, and men of the Muslim Division send you, Reichsführer, their greetings at Yuletide – the German Christmas!"

Bosnia-Herzegovina
In mid-February 1944 the Handschar Division was sent back to Bosnia-Herzegovina via train. Sauberzweig drove ahead with his personal orderly and reported to the V SS Mountain Corps on 23 February at Mostar, Herzegovina. Later, during Operation Sava in Bosnia, he addressed the men: "We have now reached the Bosnian frontier and will (soon) begin the march into the homeland. I was recently able to travel throughout almost all of Bosnia. What I saw shocked me. The fields lay uncultivated, the villages burned out and destroyed... Misery reigns in the refugee camps."

On 7 March the division celebrated the Milad al-Nabi (birthday of the Prophet Muhammad). According to Lepre: "Sauberzweig ordered that large celebrations be organized in the units by commanders and imams. These included religious rites, lectures, and the distribution of special rations."

Three days later they launched their first real combat mission – Operation Wegweiser. From 10 to 13 March 1944, the Handschar Division entered the Syrmia region of eastern Croatia, held by Partisans who were threatening the Zagreb-Belgrade railway. The unit performed well and Sauberzweig had good cause to be proud.

On 15 March the Handschar Division formally re-entered Bosnia during Operation Sava and found the land completely devastated. The Croatian Ustaše administration had melted away and there was neither security nor any functioning economy. Sauberzweig took the initiative to restore order and drafted the "Guidelines for the Liberation of Bosnia". The manifesto included references to re-opening nurseries, schools, and the domestic welfare needs of women and children, but was essentially a forceful effort to bring back law and order, and above all to secure food supplies. The protocols included confiscation of food for the soldiers. Naturally, this fell hardest or was applied more vigorously on the non-Muslim segments of the local population.

The historian George Lepre wrote: "It is clear that through this directive, Sauberzweig foresaw his division taking complete control of the region. His mandate sought to turn northeastern Bosnia into an SS vassal state, and this infuriated the Pavelić regime." Opposition from Zagreb and the Reich Foreign office meant that, ironically, much of Sauberzweig's economic and social welfare proposals were rescinded or undermined, while the more draconian aspects (particularly food requisition) remained in place. Himmler however did create an independent "SS and Police Organization Staff" on 17 April to restore order in the area under Dr. Richard Wagner.

Given the glowing accounts of Sauberzweig's men and their performance in the first two months, Himmler decided to create a second Bosnian Muslim Division (23rd Waffen Mountain Division of the SS Kama or just "Kama") in June 1944 and promoted Sauberzweig to the administration of the proposed IX Waffen-Gebirgs Korps der SS (Kroatisches). On 19 June 1944 Sauberzweig formally handed over command of Handschar to  SS Brigadeführer Desiderius Hampel and then travelled to Berlin to report in person to Himmler. On 21 June he was formally promoted to the rank of SS Gruppenführer und Generalleutnant der Waffen SS (Group Leader and General Lieutenant  of the Waffen SS).

In his formal written report submitted to Reichsführer-SS Himmler, dated 22 June, Sauberzweig stated: “When the division first went into action, it was not fully combat-ready. The infantry regiment possessed only six line companies apiece. The transfer of the Albanians (to the “Skanderbeg” Division), officers and NCOs included, made the situation worse.” Himmler blamed the poor performance of the 13th Waffen Mountain Division of the SS Handschar (1st Croatian) over August–September–October 1944 on Sauberzweig and placed him "in reserve" of the SS Führungshauptamt (SS Main Operational Office). Sauberzweig subsequently underwent a psychological assessment which observed that he had a "distinct state of nervous excitability tending [...] towards psychosis."

Return to the Wehrmacht
In January 1945 Sauberzweig returned to the Wehrmacht as Generalleutnant (Major General) and commanded "a corps within Army Group H in northern Germany."

Surrender and suicide
He surrendered to the Western Allies and on 26 September 1946 submitted a written report of his experiences with the 13th Waffen Mountain Division of the SS Handschar (1st Croatian) whilst interned by the British army at Preetz, Schleswig-Holstein. This unpublished manuscript later became an important document of the division's history. On 20 October 1946 Sauberzweig committed suicide in Civil Internment Camp No. 6 (formerly Neuengamme concentration camp) by swallowing poison rather than face extradition and trial in Yugoslavia.

His son, Professor Dr. Dieter Sauberzweig, became a prominent Kulturpolitiker or commentator on German political culture.

Opinions on Sauberzweig and his administration of the Handschar division vary greatly. The lifelong professional military careerist SS Obergruppenführer Artur Phleps praised them both. "Regarding the 13th Division, I can only report that it has performed flawlessly."

See also
List SS-Gruppenführer

Dates of Rank

Notes

References
 
 

1899 births
1946 deaths
People from Piła County
Prussian Army personnel
People from West Prussia
SS-Gruppenführer
Lieutenant generals of the German Army (Wehrmacht)
Recipients of the Iron Cross (1914), 1st class
German military personnel who committed suicide
Prisoners who died in British military detention
Waffen-SS personnel
Suicides by poison
Nazis who committed suicide in prison custody
Nazis who committed suicide in Germany